The Celeuthetini are a weevil tribe in the subfamily Entiminae.

Genera 
Acoptorrhynchus – Albertisius – Apiezonotus – Apirocalodes – Apirocalus – Apotomorhamphus – Arrhaphogaster – Atactoglymma – Atactophysis – Aulacophrys – Behrensiellus – Bonthaina – Borneobius – Borodinophilus – Brachynedus – Calidiopsis – Celeuthetes – Choerorhamphus – Cnemidothrix – Colpomus – Coptorhynchus – Cyrtetes – Ectemnomerus – Elytrocheilas – Enaptomias – Eupyrgops – Grammicodes – Hellerrhinus – Heteroglymma – Hypotactus – Idiopsodes – Javaulius – Kietana – Kokodanas – Levoecus – Lophothetes – Machaerostylus – Mesocoptus – Microthetes – Moluccobius – Mutilliarius – Nanyozo – Neopyrgops – Nothes – Oeidirrhynchus – Ogasawarazo – Opterus – Oribius – Pachyrhynchidius – Parasphenogaster – Paratactus – Peteinus – Philicoptus – Phraotes – Picronotus – Piezonotus – Platyacus – Platysimus – Platyspartus – Pseudottistira – Pteros – Pyrgops – Resites – Samobius – Sphaeropterus – Sphaerorhinus – Sphenogaster – Strotus – Syntorophus – Tarunus – Temnogastrus – Tetragynetes – Thompsoniella – Trigonops – Trigonospartus – Zeugorrhinus

References 

 Kuschel, G. 2008: Curculionoidea (weevils) of New Caledonia and Vanuatu: ancestral families and some Curculionidae. In: Grandcolas, P. (ed.), Zoologia Neocaledonica 6. Biodiversity studies in New Caledonia. Mémoires du Muséum national d’Histoire naturelle, 197: 99-250.  
 Lacordaire, T. 1863: Histoire Naturelle des Insectes. Genera des Coléoptères ou exposé méthodique et critique de tous les genres proposés jusqu'ici dans cet ordre d'insectes. Vol.: 6. Roret. Paris: 637 pp.

External links 

Entiminae